The castra of Chitid was a short-lived fort erected by the Romans in Dacia before its annexation to the Roman Empire.

See also
List of castra

Notes

External links
Roman castra from Romania - Google Maps / Earth

Roman legionary fortresses in Romania
Ancient history of Transylvania